Alpnach Dorf railway station is a Swiss railway station in the municipality of Alpnach in the canton of Obwalden. It is on the Brünig line, owned by the Zentralbahn, that links Lucerne and Interlaken.

Services 
The following services stop at Alpnachstad:

 Lucerne S-Bahn:

References

External links 
 
 

Railway stations in the canton of Obwalden
Alpnach